
This is a list of NCAA Division I women's basketball players who have accumulated both 2,500 points and 1,000 rebounds in their careers. While the NCAA's current three-division format has been in place since the 1973–74 season, the organization did not sponsor women's sports until the 1981–82 school year; before that time, women's college sports were governed by the Association of Intercollegiate Athletics for Women (AIAW). The NCAA has officially recorded rebounding statistics since it first sponsored women's basketball. Whereas 3-point field goals were officially instituted by the NCAA for women's play in the 1987–88 season.

Sabrina Ionescu, whose career at Oregon was between 2016 and 2020, also holds a unique NCAA basketball record with 2,562 points, 1,040 rebounds and 1,091 assists; the only NCAA player in any division, whether male or female, to record a 2,000/1,000/1,000. Courtney Paris, who recorded 2,729 points and 2,034 rebounds at Oklahoma between 2005 and 2009, is the only woman with more than 2,000/2,000 and only player overall with more than 2,500/2,000.

Key

List

Footnotes

References
General

Specific

2,000,career